Adrie Wouters (born 20 November 1946) is a Dutch racing cyclist. He rode in the 1970 Tour de France.

References

1946 births
Living people
Dutch male cyclists
Cyclists from Zundert